The Cambridge Chronicle is a weekly newspaper that serves Cambridge, Massachusetts. The newspaper was founded by Andrew Reid in May 1846 and is the oldest weekly newspaper in the United States. Owned by Gannett, it serves 18% of Cambridge's households.

History

Early Days 
The Cambridge Chronicle was first published on May 7, 1846. A few days before, Cambridge was incorporated as a city, and Scotsman Andrew Reid seized on the opportunity to publish a weekly newspaper. Cambridge was home to the first printing press in the Colonies, and nearby Boston was home to the first newspaper. The Publick Occurrences Both Forreign and Domestick was founded in 1690, albeit short-lived. But beginning in the 18th century, Boston developed a vibrant newspaper industry.

Several newspapers were started in Cambridge. In 1775 and 1776. Cambridge was home to the New England Chronicle, earlier known as the Essex Gazette. In 1840, the Cambridge Magnolia started its two years of publication.

1846 to 1896 
Cambridge developed a vibrant newspaper industry. The Cambridge Press was founded by James Cox in 1866. Its city editor, James W. Bean, became co-owner of the Chronicle in 1891. He set out on this venture with C. Burnside Seagrave, who had been with The Cambridge Tribune. The Cambridge Tribune from 1878 to 1966 was a competitor. It had been founded by D. Gilbert Dexter, who had worked for the Boston Journal as the Cambridge correspondent. The Cambridge News was founded by Daniel A. Buckley in 1879, who used it as a medium to promote his personal views. Since 1873, Cambridge's only daily newspaper has been The Harvard Crimson.

Editors 

The first publisher, Reid, died on January 4, 1847, and John Ford took over his role. Charles Burnside Seagrave served as editor and publisher for over 40 years, up to his retirement in 1935. Another influential editor of the paper was Eliot Spalding. He joined the Chronicle in 1926, and in 1939 became its editor, a role he held until 1971.

Corporate ownership 
The Dole family acquired the Cambridge Chronicle in the 1930s. They merged it with its rival paper, the Cambridge Sun, in 1935. The family sold the newspapers to Fidelity Investments in 1991. It was integrated into the Community Newspaper Company, another subsidiary of Fidelity Investment, in 1996.

The Community Newspaper Company was sold to the Boston Herald's owner, Herald Media, in 2001. It was again sold to GateHouse Media, in 2006.

Cambridge TAB 
In September 2012, the Chronicle merged with Tab Communications's Cambridge Tab.

Production 

The first editions were produced by hand press above the Holmes Grocery Store, on the corner of Magazine and Main Streets in Central Square. The paper is now printed in Framingham.

Circulation is down to 7,500 as of 2010.

The articles are also published on WickedLocal.com, a website owned by the Community Newspaper Company. The classifieds are produced and shared across Community Newspaper Company's newspapers in the Greater Boston North area.

References

External links 
 Cambridge Public Library. Digitized back issues of Cambridge Chronicle, 1846–1923

Cambridge, Massachusetts
Gannett publications
Newspapers published in Massachusetts
Publications established in 1846
Weekly newspapers published in the United States
1846 establishments in Massachusetts